Type 29 may refer to:

Bugatti Type 29, an automobile made by Bugatti
Bristol Type 29, a British civil utility biplane
Peugeot Type 29, an automobile made by Peugeot
Type 29, a British hardened field defence of World War II